The Forsyte Saga is a series of three novels and two interludes by John Galsworthy published between 1906 and 1921.

The Forsyte Saga may also refer to:
That Forsyte Woman, 1949 American romance film based on The Man of Property, the first novel in the series
The Forsyte Saga (1967 series), 1967 British television series based on the series of novels, and its sequel trilogy A Modern Comedy
The Forsyte Saga (2002 miniseries), 2002 British television serial based on the first two novels, The Man of Property and In Chancery, and the first interlude, Indian Summer of a Forsyte, in the series of novels
The Forsyte Saga: To Let, 2003 British television serial based on the last novel in the series, To Let